Cheung Ka-Fai may refer to:

Nick Cheung (born 1964), Hong Kong actor
Cheung Ka-fai (film editor), Hong Kong film editor and director